Graylyn Estate or Gralyn Estate or variations may refer to:

Gralyn Estate (Australian winery), Wilyabrup, Western Australia, established 1975
Graylyn Estate (Winston-Salem, North Carolina), hotel dating from 1932